Svetlana Ganina (born 11 July 1978) is a Russian table tennis player. Since 2002 she won several medals in double and team events in the Table Tennis European Championships.

She was qualified for the 2008 Summer Olympics, scheduled to play in the first round of the singles competition, but she did not actually play. She competed in both singles and doubles in 2004.

She plays in a defensive style, with occasional attacking causing much trouble for her opponents. She uses long pimples on the backhand, though she frequently anticipates the placement of her opponent and flips her racket accordingly. She has won against many top players in the world, including Fukuhara Ai and Tamara Boros in the 2006 World Team Championships, and Tie Yana in a 2007 Pro Tour event.

See also
 List of table tennis players

References

External links
 
 
 
 
 

1978 births
Living people
Russian female table tennis players
Table tennis players at the 2004 Summer Olympics
Table tennis players at the 2008 Summer Olympics
Olympic table tennis players of Russia
20th-century Russian women
21st-century Russian women